Cunning folk, also known as folk healers or wise folk, were practitioners of folk medicine, helpful folk magic and divination in Europe from the Middle Ages until the 20th century. Their practices were known as the cunning craft. Their services also included thwarting witchcraft. Although some cunning folk were denounced as witches themselves, they made up a minority of those accused, and the common people generally made a distinction between the two. The name 'cunning folk' originally referred to folk-healers and magic-workers in Britain, but the name is now applied as an umbrella term for similar people in other parts of Europe.

Names given to folk-healers and magic-workers in Europe include:

 the French devins-guérisseurs ("soothsayer-healers") and leveurs de sorts ("curse-lifters")
 the Italian fattucchiere ("fixers"), guaritori ("healers") or benandanti ("good walkers")
 the Dutch toverdokters ("magic-doctors") or duivelbanners ("devil-banners")
 the German Hexenmeister or Kräuterhexen (“herb witches”)
 the Irish bean feasa ("woman of knowledge"), banfháidh or fáidhbhean ("seeress") 
 the Spanish curanderos ("healers")
 the Portuguese curandeiros/as, benzedeiros/as ("blessers") or mulheres de virtude ("women of virtue")
 the Danish kloge folk ("wise folk")
 the Swedish klok gumma ("wise old woman") or klok gubbe ("wise old man")
 the Slavic vedmaki ("warlocks")
 the Finnish and Karelian tietäjät ("knowers")

Scandinavia

In Scandinavia the klok gumma ("wise woman") or klok gubbe ("wise man"), and collectively De kloka ("The Wise ones"), as they were known in Swedish, were usually elder members of the community who acted as folk healers and midwives as well as using folk magic such as magic rhymes. In Denmark, they were called klog mand ("wise man") and klog kone ("wise woman") and collectively as kloge folk ("wise folk").

Many Norwegian and Danish practitioners of folk magic and medicine would have a copy of the "Svartebok" (or "black book"), a tome that, according to some, was written by Cyprianus, that is, the Saint of Necromancers, Cyprian of Antioch, and to others to have been the Sixth and Seventh books of the Bible (or "Books of Moses" as the Pentateuch is known in Denmark and Norway) that were left out of the official Old Testament by the learned so that the common folk would not learn the knowledge held within the text. A formulary found in a "black book" recovered from a farm near Elverum contains many formulas such as one for a toothache that commands the user of the charm to write the words "Agerin, Nagerin, Vagerin, Jagerin, Ipagerin, Sipia" on a piece of paper using a new pen, cut the paper into three small pieces, place the first piece onto the tooth in the evening and in the morning spit the piece into the fire. This should then be repeated with the other pieces. Another charm used for helping a woman who is having a difficult labour says to take two white lily roots and give them to the mother to eat.

There is an old idea that it was "Klok gumma" who often fell victim to the Witch Trials in the 17th century, but this does not appear to be true. However, some "wise women" and "wise men" were punished, not for witchcraft but often under the indictment point of "superstition". In the 1670s, the wise man Johan Eriksson of Knutby was sentenced to seven gauntlet for "superstition", and again in the 1680s to nine. Per Ericsson of Dalarna, who read the diseases in wine, was punished both in 1720 and 1726. Brita Biörn of Gotland said in court that she learned to heal the sick when she spent some time in the underworld, and she was sentenced to prison terms in both 1722 and 1737. The punishment of Sweden's "cunning folk" only seemed to have the opposite effect. Ericsson said that his clients had been coming in greater numbers after the rulings against him, and that he would be forced to hide if he was to obey the court and refrain from his practice, and in the Biörn case, the vicar complained that people from throughout the country came to seek her help, and relied on her as a God after her first sentence. The sentences, in reality, had the effect of good advertising, and Brita's daughter and granddaughter's daughter were also healing women.

There are many examples of well-known "cunning folk" who were known far beyond their village boundaries, such as Ingeborg i Mjärhult in the 18th century and Kisamor and Gota-Lena in the 19th century. In the 16th century, Brigitta Andersdotter was often hired by Queen Margaret Leijonhufvud. In Norway some women such as Mor Sæther (1793–1851), Anna Brandfjeld (1810–1905) and Valborg Valland (1821–1903) achieved national fame, unusual for women of the time.

The customs persisted well into the 20th century, until the medical doctor became more accessible to the public. In the 19th century, every neighbourhood in Norway had at least one folk-healer. Such beliefs in folk-medicine, magic, and the use of "black books" were taken by migrants to the Americas. However, many beliefs died out in Norwegian-American communities around the 1920s with many not having knowledge of the subject or of the "black book". Knowledge of these beliefs did last longer in Norway, even if they were not commonly believed in by Norwegians.

Britain

The term "cunning man" or "cunning woman" was most widely used in southern England and the Midlands, as well as in Wales. Such people were also frequently known across England as "wizards", "wise men" or "wise women", or in southern England and Wales as "conjurers" or as "dyn(es) hysbys" (knowing man or woman) in the Welsh language. In Cornwall they were sometimes referred to as "pellars", which some etymologists suggest originated from the term "expellers", referring to the practice of expelling evil spirits. Folklorists often used the term "white witch", though this was infrequently used amongst the ordinary folk as the term "witch" had general connotations of evil.

Certain Christian theologians and Church authorities believed that the cunning folk, being practitioners of magic, were in league with the Devil and as such were akin to the more overtly Satanic and malevolent witches. Partly because of this, laws were enacted across England, Scotland and Wales that often condemned cunning folk and their magical practices, but there was no widespread persecution of them akin to the Witch Hunt, largely because most common people firmly distinguished between the two: witches were seen as being harmful and cunning folk as useful.

In England during the Early Mediaeval period, various forms of folk magic could be found amongst the Anglo-Saxons, who referred to such practitioners as wicca (male) or wicce (female), or at times also as dry, practitioners of drycraeft, the latter of which have been speculated as being anglicised terms for the Irish drai, a term referring to druids, who appeared as anti-Christian sorcerers in much Irish literature of the period.

Some of the spells and charms that had been used in the Anglo-Saxon polytheist era continued to be used following Christianization. However, as historian Owen Davies noted, "although some such pre-Christian magic continued, to label it pagan is to misrepresent the people who used it and the context in which it was used."

In England and Wales, cunning folk had operated throughout the latter part of the Mediaeval and into the Early Modern period. In the 15th and 16th centuries, there had been no attempt to illegalise the cunning craft, although private lawsuits had been brought against some of them by those clients who felt that they had been cheated out of their money. This changed with the first of the Witchcraft Acts, the Witchcraft Act of 1542, enacted under the reign of Henry VIII, which targeted both witches and cunning folk, and which prescribed the death penalty for such crimes as using invocations and conjurations to locate treasure or to cast a love spell. This law was repealed no later than 1547, under the reign of Henry's son Edward VI, something that the historian Owen Davies believed was due to those in power changing their opinion on the law: they believed that either the death penalty was too harsh for such crimes or that the practice of the cunning craft was a moral issue that was better for the Church to deal with in ecclesiastic courts rather than a problem that had to be sorted out by the state.

For the following few decades, the magical practices of the cunning folk remained legal, despite opposition from certain religious authorities. It was a time of great religious upheaval in the country as Edward's successor, his sister Mary I, reimposed Roman Catholicism, before Anglicanism was once again restored under Elizabeth I. In 1563, after the return of power to the Anglican Church of England, a bill was passed by parliament designed to illegalise "Conjurations, Enchantments and Witchcrafts", again being aimed at both the alleged witches and the cunning folk. However, this law was not as harsh as its earlier predecessor, with the death penalty being reserved for those who were believed to have conjured an evil spirit or murdered someone through magical means, whilst those for whom the use of magic was a first offence faced a year's imprisonment and four stints in the pillory. Nonetheless, this law would have little effect on the cunning folk, as "the attention and focus of the courts shifted away from the activities of cunning-folk and towards the maleficium of supposed witches" - the Witch Hunt that had been raging in Scotland and in many parts of continental Europe had finally arrived in England.

Whilst across England, many people were accused of witchcraft by members of their local communities and put on trial, the cunning folk very rarely suffered a similar fate. It was unusual for a cunning man or woman to actually be accused of witchcraft; in the county of Essex for instance, whereas around four hundred people had been put on trial for witchcraft, only four of those were identifiably cunning folk. However, many of the professional witch-hunters and theologians continued to proclaim the cunning craft as being the same as witchcraft, with them both being caused by the Devil.

With the decline in the witch trials in the latter part of the 17th and early 18th centuries, partly due to the rise of the Enlightenment amongst the educated elite, a new law was introduced, the Witchcraft Act of 1736. Unlike earlier laws, this did not accept the existence of magic, and took the opinion that there never had been any witches, and it, therefore, came down heavier on the cunning folk, who were claiming to perform genuine magical spells. It portrayed the cunning folk as practitioners of "explicitly fraudulent practices designed to fool the credulous" in order to gain money off of them.

Germany

The belief in cunning folk and the use of "white magic" to be used for healing and as protection against "black magic" was once widespread in Germany; however, during the early modern period such practices gradually became less accepted by the authorities, partly because the belief in "white magic" was viewed by the church authorities to be contrary to Biblical teachings and partly due to the loss of revenues for certain groups such as barber-surgeons and physicians, as was the case in Rothenburg ob der Tauber in which periodical action was taken against users of "white magic". The usual punishment was banishment rather than execution as was common for others convicted of witchcraft and the use of "black magic" 

In Germany practitioners of folk-magic were almost always female; however, by contrast the Hexenmeister (also a term for a warlock) or Hexenfinder who hunted witches and "neutralised" them on behalf of society was always male.

Ireland

In Ireland, the cunning-folk were known as bean feasa ("woman of knowledge"); banfháidh or fáidhbhean ("female seer"); bean bhán ("white woman"), bean chaointe ("keening woman") and bean ghlúine ("joint woman"). These would provide traditional herbal cures and perform funeral tasks like preparing corpses. Gearoid Ó Crualaoich described the bean feasa as “an oracular authority for her community regarding the meaning and significance of experiences they fail to understand.” Biddy Early (1798–1872) was a famous practitioner.

Male practitioners also existed, primarily providing traditional cures. They were known as fear feasa ("man of knowledge") or lucht pisreoga ("people of traditions").

Italy 
The names used for cunning-folk in Italy vary from region to region, although such names include praticos (wise people), guaritori (healers), fattucchiere (fixers), donne che aiutano (women who help) and mago, maga or maghiardzha (sorcerers). At times, they were sometimes called streghe (witches), although usually only "behind their backs or by those who either are sceptical of their powers or believe they deal in black magic." Unlike in other parts of Europe, such as Britain, the cunning profession survived the 20th century and into the early 21st, allowing Italian-American sociologist Sabina Magliocco to make a brief study of them (2009).

As in the rest of Europe, the primary role of the Italian cunning-folk was apparently in healing, both through the use of herbs and through spiritual healing. The former required knowledge about various plants and herbs on the behalf of the cunning-person, although the spiritual healing was believed to come from an inner power, known as la forza (power), la virtù (virtue) or il Segno (the sign). Such healing was often in the form of removing the malocchio, or evil eye, which had cursed someone.

Italian cunning craft was, and continued to remain rooted in the country's Roman Catholicism, which is evident from the use of charms and prayers, which often call upon the aid of saints. Such magical practitioners also widely believed that they dealt with spirit beings, both benevolent (who would aid them) and malevolent (whom they would have to combat). The latter included the unquiet dead as well as supernatural witches who were believed to cause harm to people, whilst the former included ancestors, the helpful dead and saints, who could help defeat these malevolent entities. Magical tools were also utilised by Italian cunning-folk, and whilst these varied between both regions and practitioners, these commonly include fiber ropes or cords to bind, knives or scissors to cut away illness, and mirrors and weapons to reflect or scare away malevolent spirits.

See also

References

Bibliography

 
European folklore
Magic (supernatural)
Traditional healthcare occupations
Witchcraft in Italy
Folklore characters